HD 240210 b is a 6.9 Jupiter-mass exoplanet discovered on June 10, 2009 by Niedzielski et al. using the Hobby-Eberly Telescope. It orbits the K3 giant star HD 240210 in the constellation of Cassiopeia. Its average orbital separation is at 1.33 Astronomical Units away from its star with a year of 501.75 days.

See also 
 BD+14°4559 b
 BD+20°2457 b
 BD+20°2457 c
 HD 240210

References 

Exoplanets discovered in 2009
Giant planets
Cassiopeia (constellation)
Exoplanets detected by radial velocity